Darwin Eusebio Oliva García (born 21 March 1989) is a Honduran-Guatemalan footballer currently playing for Municipal.

Club career
A forward, he was born in Honduras but gained Guatemalan citizenship in 2010. With Municipal, he helped the team capture the 2009–2010 Clausura title, scoring a goal in the second leg of the final against Xelajú MC.

References

External links
 

1989 births
Living people
People from La Ceiba
Guatemalan people of Honduran descent
Honduran emigrants to Guatemala
Association football forwards
Honduran footballers
Deportes Savio players
C.S.D. Municipal players
Liga Nacional de Fútbol Profesional de Honduras players
Honduras under-20 international footballers
Honduras youth international footballers